France Bleu Provence is one of the 44 regional radio stations of the France Bleu network. It serves the departments of Bouches-du-Rhône and Var. It is accessible to as far as Val du Durance and Gapençais via FM radio.

History 
The station began broadcasting in 1983 under the name . It used this name until September 4, 2000, when it became France Bleu Provence.

Headquarters 

In addition to its headquarters in Aix-en-Provence, France Bleu Provence has offices for its reporters in Toulon and Marseille, on rue de l'Évêché. In the past, the station also had locations in Arles and Martigues during the 2000s.

References 

French-language radio stations
Radio stations in France
Radio stations established in 1983
1983 establishments in France